Martin Bellemare is a Canadian playwright. He is most noted for his plays Le chant de Georges Boivin, which won the Prix Gratien-Gélinas in 2009, and Cœur minéral, which won the Governor General's Award for French-language drama at the 2020 Governor General's Awards.

A graduate of the National Theatre School of Canada, he was a finalist for the Siminovitch Prize in Theatre in 2020.

Works
Quelque chose de beau (2005)
Le bilboquet ou la folie racontée aux enfants (2006)
Cabaret au bazar, Un cabaret musical pour les petits (2006, collective work with Fabien Cloutier, Louis-Dominique Lavigne, Suzanne Lebeau, Jean-Philippe Lehoux, Étienne Lepage, Marilyn Perreault, Philippe Robert and Lise Vaillancourt)
Tuer le moustique (2008)
Un château sur le dos (2008)
Le chant de Georges Boivin (2009)
La liberté (2011) 
La chute de l'escargot (2011)
Des pieds et des mains (2012)
Contes urbains (2013, collective work with Sébastien David, Rébecca Déraspe, Annick Lefebvre, Julie-Anne Ranger-Beauregard and Olivier Sylvestre)
Saucisse bacon (2013)
Nouvelles pratiques commerciales (2013)
L'Armoire (2013)
Assistance à personne en danger (2014)
Barbus au sommet d'une montagne (2015)
Territoire (2015)
Le cri de la girafe (2015)
L'oreille de mer (2016)
Moule Robert (2016)
Maître Karim la perdrix (2016)
Par tes yeux (2017)
Amours profonds (2017)
Cœur minéral (2017)
Le bizarre jour bizarre où (2017)
L'échelle (2018)

References

21st-century Canadian dramatists and playwrights
21st-century Canadian male writers
Canadian male dramatists and playwrights
Canadian dramatists and playwrights in French
French Quebecers
Writers from Quebec
Governor General's Award-winning dramatists
Living people
Year of birth missing (living people)